Omurano is an unclassified language from Peru. It is also known as Humurana, Roamaina, Numurana, Umurano, and Mayna. The language was presumed to have become extinct by 1958, but in 2011 a rememberer was found who knew some 20 words in Omurano; he claimed that there were still people who could speak it.

It was spoken near the Urituyacu River (a tributary of the Marañón River), or on the Nucuray River according to Loukotka (1968).

Classification
Tovar (1961) linked Omurano to Taushiro (and later Taushiro with Kandoshi); Kaufman (1994) finds the links reasonable, and in 2007 he classified Omurano and Taushiro (but not Kandoshi) as Saparo–Yawan languages.

Maynas, once mistaken for a synonym, is a separate language.

Despite there being previous proposals linking Omurano with Zaparoan, de Carvalho (2013) finds no evidence that Omurano is related to Zaparoan.

Language contact
Jolkesky (2016) notes that there are lexical similarities with the Urarina, Arawak, Zaparo, and Leko language families due to contact.

Vocabulary
A word list by Tessmann (1930) is the primary source for Omurano lexical data.

Loukotka (1968) lists the following basic vocabulary items.

{| class="wikitable sortable"
! gloss !! Omurana
|-
| one || nadzóra
|-
| two || dzoʔóra
|-
| head || na-neyalok
|-
| eye || an-atn
|-
| woman || mparáwan
|-
| fire || íno
|-
| sun || héna
|-
| star || dzuñ
|-
| maize || aíchia
|-
| house || ána
|-
| white || chalama
|}

See also
 Maina Indians
 Extinct languages of the Marañón River basin
 Classification of indigenous languages of the Americas

Further reading
O'Hagan, Zachary J. (2011). Omurano field notes. (Manuscript).

References

Indigenous languages of the Andes
Languages of Peru
Extinct languages of South America
Language isolates of South America